King Cowboy is a 1928 American silent Western film directed by Robert De Lacey and starring Tom Mix, Sally Blane and Lew Meehan.

Cast
 Tom Mix as Tex Rogers  
 Sally Blane as Polly Randall  
 Lew Meehan as Ralph Bennett  
 Barney Furey as 'Shorty' Sims  
 Frank Leigh as Abdul El Hassan  
 Wynn Mace as Ben Suliman Ali 
 Bob Fleming as Jim Randall

References

Bibliography 
 Jensen, Richard D. The Amazing Tom Mix: The Most Famous Cowboy of the Movies. 2005.

External links 
 

1928 Western (genre) films
Films directed by Robert De Lacey
1928 films
American black-and-white films
Film Booking Offices of America films
Silent American Western (genre) films
1920s English-language films
1920s American films